Henry Jones Underwood (1804–1852) was an  English architect who spent most of his career in Oxford. He was the brother of the architects Charles Underwood (circa 1791–1883) and George Allen Underwood (dates unknown).

Underwood trained in London as a pupil of Henry Hake Seward and then joined the office of Sir Robert Smirke. In 1830 he moved to Oxford where much of his work involved designing churches or schools. He built Saint Paul's parish church, Walton Street, and the library of the Oxford Botanic Garden in the Greek Revival style but is best known for his Gothic Revival architecture. His church at Littlemore for Newman became a model for other churches.

Underwood designed an extension to Oxford Prison. In 1852 he committed suicide at the White Hart Hotel, Bath, Somerset so J. C. Buckler completed the extension in his stead.

Works
Saint John the Baptist parish church, Summertown, Oxford, 1831 (demolished 1924)
Exeter College, Oxford: buildings on Turl Street and Broad Street, 1833-34
Pembroke College, Oxford: rebuilding of Wolsey's Almshouses, 1834
Saint Mary and Saint Nicholas parish church, Littlemore, Oxfordshire, 1835
Botanic Garden, Oxford: library, 1835
Saint Paul's parish church, Walton Street, Oxford, 1836 (now Freud's bar)
Saint Peter's parish church, Bushey Heath, Hertfordshire, 1836-37
Parish church of the Ascension, Littleworth, Vale of White Horse, 1839
All Saints' parish church, Llangorwen, 1839
Holy Trinity parish church, Lower Beeding, West Sussex, 1840
Holy Trinity, Burdrop (Sibford Gower), Oxfordshire, 1840
Saint Giles' parish church, Horspath, Oxfordshire: rebuilt chancel, 1840
Saint Mary's parish, Broughton, Oxfordshire: extension of Rectory, 1842
Saint John the Baptist parish church, Bodicote, Oxfordshire: rebuilt church, 1844
Saint Mary's parish church, Swerford, Oxfordshire: north aisle, 1846
Saint Leonard's parish church, Woodcote, Oxfordshire: rebuilt church, 1846
Littlemore Hospital, Littlemore, Oxfordshire: extension, 1847
Saint Sepulchre's Cemetery, Oxford: chapel, 1848 (demolished circa 1970)
Oxford Prison extension, 1848-56
Christ Church Unitarian chapel, Banbury, 1850 (demolished circa 1972)
Saint Giles' parish church, Horspath: north aisle and north transept, 1852

His work also includes Holy Trinity Church, Oxford and the north aisle of Saint Thomas's parish church, Oxford. (date uncertain).

References

Sources

 (in Google Books)

1804 births
1852 deaths
19th-century English architects
Gothic Revival architects
English ecclesiastical architects
Architects from Oxford
1850s suicides